Ajita, Ajitha or Ajeeta may refer to:
 Ajita, an alternative name of the future Buddha Maitreya
 Ajita, a name applied to various mythological figures, including Shiva, Vishnu and Ajitanatha
 Ajit (given name), an Indian masculine given name (including a list of persons with the name) 
 Ajita Kesakambali, ancient Indian philosopher
 K. Ajitha, former Indian naxalite
 Ajita Wilson (c.1950 – 1987), American actress
 Ajita Suchitra Veera, Indian film director, writer and photographer

See also 
 Ajit (disambiguation)
 Ajitha purana